Antonio Saura is a station on Line 1 of the Metro Ligero. It is located in fare Zone A.

References 

Madrid Metro Ligero stations
Railway stations in Spain opened in 2007
Buildings and structures in Hortaleza District, Madrid